Boulevard Blazers F.C. is a football club based in Pembroke Parish, Bermuda, who currently play in the Bermudian Premier Division.

History
The club, also named Boulevard Community Club, has won the Bermudian league title twice.

Blazers were relegated from the top tier in March 2012 and only returned to the Bermudian Premier Division for the 2015/16 season after beating Somerset Eagles to claim the First Division title in March 2015.

Players

Current squad
 For 2015–2016 season

Historical list of coaches

 Andrew Bascome (Sep 2009-)
 Derrick Bean (Aug 2012–)
 Aaron Williams (2013- Mar 2015)
 Keemo Smith (Aug 2015–present)

Honours
Bermudian Premier Division: 2
 1990-91, 1994-95

References

External links
 Club page - Bermuda FA

Football clubs in Bermuda
Association football clubs established in 1973
1973 establishments in Bermuda